The Xuanjin Bridge is a historic stone arch bridge over the moat of the Ming Palace in Qinhuai District, Nanjing, Jiangsu, China.

History
Xuanjin Bridge was originally built between 1368 and 1398 during the Hongwu Emperor's reign of the Ming dynasty (1368–1644). In the Kangxi era of the Qing dynasty (1644–1911), due to the naming taboo of "Xuan" (Kangxi Emperor's bornname "Xuanye"), its name was changed to "Yuanjin Bridge".

In December 2011, it was classified as a provincial cultural relic preservation organ by the Government of Jiangsu.

Gallery

References

Bridges in Jiangsu
Arch bridges in China
Bridges completed in the 14th century
Ming dynasty architecture
Buildings and structures completed in the 14th century
14th-century establishments in China